Project Runway Season 1 was the first season of Project Runway, Bravo's reality competition show for fashion designers.  The season received critical acclaim including an Emmy nomination for outstanding competitive reality series. Growth in audience popularity was also dramatic from its debut to the season finale, making it a sleeper hit. Project Runway gave Bravo one of its most successful series since Queer Eye for the Straight Guy.

The winning designer of the first season was Pennsylvania-based designer Jay McCarroll.  As his prize for winning the competition among 12 designers, McCarroll won $100,000, a mentorship with Banana Republic to aid in developing his own fashion label, and a feature of his work in the American edition of ELLE magazine. The winning model of the first season, selected by McCarroll, was Julia Beynon. McCarroll later turned down both the $100,000 and the mentorship with Banana Republic, stating that the prizes came with too much contractual baggage.

Austin Scarlett later appeared in Project Runway: All Stars in 2012, where he finished runner-up. Wendy Pepper, in the same year, competed in the second season of the All Stars edition placing 12th out of 13.  In 2016, Daniel Franco competed in the fifth season of the All Stars edition, placing 12th out of 13.

Contestants
The 12 fashion designers competing in the first season were:

The 12 models competing for an ELLE spread in the first season were:

Challenges

Results
 The designer won Project Runway Season 1.
 The designer won that challenge.
 The designer had the second highest score for that challenge.
 The designer had one of the highest scores for that challenge, but did not win.
 The designer had one of the lowest scores for that challenge, but was not eliminated.
 The designer was in the bottom two, but was not eliminated.
 The designer lost and was out of the competition.

: Although Nora's team was voted the best, the judges thought that Nora's teamwork was very poor, therefore she was placed in the bottom two.

Rate The Runway

Models

 The model was the winner of Project Runway Season 1
 The model wore the winning designer's outfit
 The model wore the losing designer's outfit
 The model was eliminated

Notes:
 Designers chose their models prior to each challenge, with the winner of the previous challenge choosing first and the other designers choosing in random order. The model who was not chosen would be eliminated.
 Since models are eliminated at the beginning of the next episode, no model was eliminated in episode 1.
 There are only 10 sections for models instead of 11 because no models were out in the reunion episode.
 During Episode 8, while Jay had selected Julia, she was unable to attend the runway showing. Austin walked in her place.

Designer legend
Alexandra Vidal: AV
Austin Scarlett: AS
Daniel Franco: DF
Jay McCarroll: JM
Kara Saun: KS
Kevin Johnn: KJ
Mario Cadenas: MC
Nora Caliguri: NC
Robert Plotkin: RP
Starr Ilzhoefer: SI
Vanessa Riley: VR
Wendy Pepper: WP

Episodes

Episode 1: Innovation
Original airdate: December 1, 2004

Designers created a sexy, glamorous outfit for a night on the town made only from materials bought at a Manhattan supermarket. The designers had a budget of $50 and one hour to make their purchases. They had one day to complete the design and the winner had immunity for the next challenge and could not be eliminated.

Guest Judge: Patricia Field.

WINNER: Austin
ELIMINATED: Daniel

Episode 2: Vision
Original airdate: December 8, 2004

Designers used plain white cotton jersey to build a garment that conveys "envy." They had a budget of $50 and one day to complete the design.

Guest Judges: Constance White & Paul Berman

WINNER: Kara
ELIMINATED: Mario

Episode 3: Commercial Appeal
Original airdate: December 15, 2004

Designers created a holiday dress to fit with Banana Republic's current line. They had to pick their fabrics at the studios and had two days to complete their designs.

Guest Judge: Deborah Lloyd

WINNER: Wendy
ELIMINATED: Starr

Episode 4: Collaboration
Original airdate: January 5, 2005

The designers created a new look for rising rock star Sarah Hudson. A team event with three teams, each with a lead designer and two assistants. Each team had $150 and one day to complete the design.

Guest Judge: Sarah Hudson

WINNER: Kevin
ELIMINATED: Vanessa

Episode 5: "Model" Clients
Original airdate: January 12, 2005

Working with their chosen models, the designers created a wedding dress for that model. The designers had a budget of $300 and two days to complete the design.

Guest Judges: Anne Slowey & Amsale Aberra

WINNER: Kara
ELIMINATED: Nora

Episode 6: Making A Splash
Original airdate: January 19, 2005

Designers made swimsuits, then attended an evening party with their swimsuit-clad models. The designers had a budget of $75 and five hours to complete their garments. The winner was the designer who received a mention from New York Post reporter Richard Johnson on "Page Six," the newspaper's gossip column.

Guest Judges: Constance White, Anne Slowey & New York Post reporter Richard Johnson

WINNER: Austin
ELIMINATED: Alexandra

Episode 7: Design A Collection
Original airdate: January 26, 2005

Designers created a collection for the year 2055 as one team. Kevin was the team leader for this challenge. Each designer had a budget of $50 and one day to complete the collection.

Guest Judge: Betsey Johnson

WINNER: Kara
ELIMINATED: Kevin

Episode 8: Postal Uniform Challenge
Original airdate: February 2, 2005

Designers redesigned the uniform worn by United States Postal Service workers. The designers had a budget of $100 and one day to complete the design. This episode is particularly notable for the fact that Jay's model was unable to attend the runway showing in time. As a result, Austin walked in her place and received positive feedback for doing so by the judges.

Guest Judge: United States Postal Service worker Becky Negich.

WINNER: Kara
ELIMINATED: Robert

Note: Kara is the first designer to win two challenges in a row.

Episode 9: Design For The Red Carpet
Original airdate: February 9, 2005

Designers created a dress for Access Hollywood reporter Nancy O'Dell to wear to the Grammys. The designers had $300 and two days to complete the design.

Guest Judge: Nancy O'Dell

WINNER: Wendy
ELIMINATED: Austin

Episode 10: Reunion
Original airdate: February 16, 2005

All of the participating designers gathered for a reunion hosted by Heidi Klum and Tim Gunn on the eve of Olympus New York Fashion Week at which the final three designers displayed their collections.

Episode 11: Finale
Original airdate: February 23, 2005

The final three designers—Jay, Kara Saun and Wendy—were visited by Tim Gunn at their homes to show the progress of their collections. Each designer created a twelve piece collection for a showing at New York Olympus Fashion Week. Kara Saun had designer shoes created for her collection, however producers determined that was in breach of the contract.

Guest Judge: Parker Posey

WINNER: Jay
ELIMINATED: Kara (1st Runner-Up), Wendy (2nd Runner-Up)

References

External links

Alexandra Vidal official web site
Austin Scarlett official web site
Jay McCarroll official web site
Kara Saun official web site
Mario Cadenas official web site
Wendy Pepper official web site
Daniel Franco official web site
Richard Johnson Page Six

Project Runway (American series)
2004 American television seasons
2004 in fashion
2005 American television seasons
2005 in fashion